Henry Chandos Pole Gell (10 January 1829 – 31 October 1902) was a High Sheriff of Derbyshire in 1886/7. He took the additional surname Gell when he inherited the Gell fortune in 1842.

Biography
Henry Chandos Pole was the second son of Edward Sacheverell Chandos Pole, of Radbourne Hall. In 1842, he took the arms and surname Gell when he succeeded to the estate at Hopton Hall. Gell was High Sheriff in 1866/7. For many years main residence was at Heverswood (south of Brasted) in Kent as he leased Hopton Hall to a relative.

Gell took an active interest in agricultural development, and was a member of the council of the Royal Agricultural Society of England. A contemporary obituary states that Gell was ″well known throughout the country by reason of the deep interest he took in agriculture... he maintained an excellent heard of shorthorns at Hopton, and was one of the first to perceive the importance of the shire horse.″

Gell had five daughters with his first wife who died in 1868. He married the following year Teresa Charlotte Manningham-Buller, daughter of Sir Edward Manningham-Buller, 1st Baronet, of Dilhorne Hall, Staffordshire. They had a son, Harry Anthony Chandos-Pole-Gell (1872-1934), who became a Brigadier-General and relinquished the surname Gell in the 1930s. Harry Chandos-Pole-Gell was married to Ada Ismay, the daughter of Thomas Henry Ismay.

Gell died at his residence Hopton Hall on 31 October 1902, and he was buried at Carsington.

References

People from South Derbyshire District
1902 deaths
1829 births
High Sheriffs of Derbyshire
People from Brasted